Our Lady of Saidnaya Patriarchal Monastery is a monastery of the Greek Orthodox Church of Antioch located in Saidnaya, Syria. It is one of the most ancient monasteries in the world and in the region of the Middle East and North Africa, traditionally held to have been founded by Byzantine emperor Justinian I in 547 AD. It is run by a religious order of nuns. It is an important pilgrimage site for Christians, who visit an icon of Saint Mary which is attributed to Saint Luke.

Description
The main chapel has numerous icons and a wooden iconostasis in front of the altar. The pilgrimage shrine, separate from the main chapel, contains the aforementioned icon of Mary, called Shaghoura ("the Illustrious"). The icon is kept hidden behind an ornate, silver-doored niche, while on either side of this shrine are a number of later icons. Numerous beaten silver crosses and other religious symbols, left as ex votos by pilgrims, are displayed on the walls.

History

Tradition holds that the monastery was built by the Byzantine emperor Justinian I in 547 AD, following two visions of Mary. One indicated the intended site of the church, while the other outlined its design. Justinian dedicated the finished project on the Feast of Mary's Nativity, and annually thereafter on September 8 Christian pilgrims arrive at the monastery to honour Our Lady of Saidnaya.

The monastery was damaged during the Syrian civil war.

See also 
List of heritage sites damaged during Syrian civil war
Mary in Islam
Shrines to the Virgin Mary

References

External links 
 Our Lady of Saydnaya Patriarchal Monastery (antiochpatriarchate.org)

Christian monasteries in Syria
Eastern Orthodox pilgrimage sites
Eastern Orthodox church buildings dedicated to Theotokos
Greek Orthodox monasteries
Greek Orthodoxy in Syria
Shrines to the Virgin Mary
540s establishments in the Byzantine Empire
Christian monasteries established in the 6th century
547 establishments